Benjamin Bangs Eastman (July 19, 1911 – October 6, 2002), alias "Blazin' Ben", was an American middle distance runner. He was born in Burlingame, California, and graduated from Stanford University in 1933.

He competed for the United States in the 1932 Summer Olympics held in Los Angeles, United States in the 400 metres where he won the silver medal. He was the U.S. national 800 metres champion in 1934.

Eastman, one of three Americans to hold the world record in both the 400 and 800 meters, was voted into the Track and Field Hall of Fame in 2006. He died in Hotchkiss, Colorado, aged 91.

References

External links 
 
 

1911 births
2002 deaths
American male middle-distance runners
Athletes (track and field) at the 1932 Summer Olympics
World record setters in athletics (track and field)
People from Burlingame, California
People from Delta County, Colorado
Olympic silver medalists for the United States in track and field
Stanford Cardinal men's track and field athletes
Track and field athletes from California
Medalists at the 1932 Summer Olympics